The 1936 Lafayette Leopards football team was an American football team that represented Lafayette College in the Middle Three Conference during the 1936 college football season. In its first and only season under head coach Ernie Nevers, the team compiled a 1–8 record. Benjamin Snyder was the team captain.

Schedule

References

Lafayette
Lafayette Leopards football seasons
Lafayette Leopards football